Cross Creek High School (CCHS) is a public high school located in the South Augusta area of Augusta, Georgia, United States. The school is located within the Richmond County School System.

History
Cross Creek High School opened in 1999, for convenience and to relieve overcrowding at nearby Hephzibah High School and Butler High School.

Cross Creek is one of the highest ranking schools in Georgia.

Demographics

Student activities

Athletics
The school offers an array of team sports and programs. The school has personnel and coaches who facilitate the development of student athletes. These sports include football, soccer, softball, baseball, tennis, track,  basketball, golf, volleyball, wrestling, cross country, and cheerleading.

Clubs and organizations

The Cross Creek Athletic Booster Club is a parent-based organization providing support for student athletes both on and off the field. Money is raised through several fundraisers during the school year.  These fundraisers include a football concession sale, a chicken dinner, concessions from the Richmond County Recreation Track meet, and membership fees.

Chorus
The Cross Creek Chorus began in 1999 (the year of the school's opening). Since then the choir has been a constant staple in the fabric of the school and surrounding community. On average, the group boasts about 10% of the school's total population. Its first director was Sonya Bailey. The choir has been under the direction of its second director Jerome Peterson since 2006.

This ensemble has the privilege of having several factions in the form of the Concert Choir, Men's Chorus, Women's Chorus, Show Choir, Men's Quartet, and the Women's Trio. In addition, the chorus has the benefit of having several soloists who are competitive for scholarships and awards. The chorus is regularly adjudicated by The Georgia Music Educator's Large Group Performance Evaluation, proceedings where they consistently receive Superior and Excellent ratings. This group has a Parent Booster Support Organization which facilitates their heavy performance schedule. They also support the yearly musical which is performed in conjunction with the Cross Creek Players Drama Department. Friends and supporters can follow the Cross Creek Chorus on Facebook.

DECA 
DECA is a national association for students enrolled in Marketing Education classes.  National DECA was founded in 1946, with Georgia DECA preceding the national organization by two years.  The group offers students diverse opportunities to develop their leadership skills and job skills through participation at region, state, and national competitions.  DECA provides over a half million dollars in scholarships annually to deserving high school seniors. Cross Creek's DECA Chapter was founded during the 1999–2000 school year.

FFA 
The National FFA Organization, founded in 1928 as the Future Farmers of America, is a dynamic youth leadership organization that strives to make a positive difference in the lives of students by developing their potential for leadership, personal growth and career success through agricultural education.

Media Club 
Various goals of the club include providing an avenue to celebrate and encourage reading, and to have a forum to suggest and discuss books.  Another goal is to promote the Media Center through video, book talks, activities, and events.

Philosophy Club 
This is an academic club for students who have bright and open minds, sometimes question authority, and enjoy reading and discussing big ideas.

Thespians/Drama 
Cross Creek has won many awards, including Best Scenery, Best Actor, and Best Supporting Actor. The drama department has performed in many events and competitions including international events such as those performed in Scotland.

Homecoming 
Every year, Cross Creek High School hosts Homecoming events during selected football games with participation from all grade levels and includes CCHS alumni participation. Homecoming has a high participation rate and many students and former students tailgate to celebrate the event.

NJROTC
Cross Creek's NJROTC unit includes very competitive rifle teams and drill teams who compete in local, regional, and national competitions. CCHS NJROTC focuses on the development of cadets in athletics, academics, orienteering, and overall personal inspection during its annual military inspection. CCHS is in NJROTC Area 12, where the unit is always a fierce competitor. The Razorback Regiment has also been a distinguished unit since 2000 (the school opened in 1999).

References

External links
Cross Creek High School

Educational institutions established in 1999
High schools in Richmond County, Georgia
Public high schools in Georgia (U.S. state)
1999 establishments in Georgia (U.S. state)